Prag Cine Awards North-East 2017 is a ceremony, presented by the Prag Network, honoured the actors, technical achievements, and films censored in 2016 from Assam and rest of Northeast India, took place on June 17–18, 2017 at Kokrajhar, Assam.

Winners and nominees 
In this edition of Prag Cine Awards, awards were given in 26 different categories to the Assamese films produced from Assam and other language films produced from Northeast India which were censored in the year of 2016. Maj Rati Keteki topped the nomination list with ten nominations.

Awards for films from Assam 
Winners are listed first and highlighted in boldface.

Awards for films from rest of northeast India 
Winners are listed first and highlighted in boldface.

Other awards 
 Best Book on Film – Xukhi Manuhor Chalachitra Aru Onainyo by Pranjal Bora
 Jury’s Special Mention
 Mahaendra Rabha (Child Artist, Maj Rati Keteki)
 Bipasha Daimari (Child Artist, Zero: the value of life)
 Jury Special Honour – Kulada Kumar Bhattacharya (Dikchow Banat Palaax)
 Special Felicitation for Contribution to Assamese Cinema – Rajesh Jashpal (Gaane Ki Aane)

References

Cinema of Assam